Maeda Toshinori may refer to:

Maeda Toshinori (Daishoji) (1833–1855), daimyō of Daishoji Domain
Maeda Toshinori (Toyama) (1787-1801), daimyō of Toyama Domain

See also
Maeda clan